Asura manusi is a moth of the family Erebidae. It is found on the Admiralty Islands.

References

manusi
Moths described in 1916
Moths of New Guinea